S. D. Vijay Milton is an Indian cinematographer and director working in Tamil films. He directed the romantic comedy film Azhagai Irukkirai Bayamai Irukkirathu (2006) starring Bharath and Mallika Kapoor. He received critical acclaim for his work in Kaadhal (2004), Vazhakku Enn 18/9 (2012), Goli Soda (2014) and Kadugu (2017).

Career
Following the success of Goli Soda, Vijay Milton directed a film titled 10 Enradhukulla, a road movie featuring Vikram and Samantha. In 2017, He directed Kadugu which is released by Suriya 's 2D Entertainment and won positive reviews from critics. He then directed Goli Soda 2 (known as GST) with his own production company Rough Note Production. Cinematographer cum Director has started his next venture in 2020, by joining hands with Kannada SuperStar Shiva Rajkumar, marking his maiden directorial in Kannada Film Industry (Sandalwood), with most of the scenes been shot, production is delayed due to Covid-19 pandemic. He is now set to Direct a Tamil film starring Vijay Antony.

Filmography

Awards
2nd South Indian International Movie Awards
 Nominated—Best Cinematographer for Vazhakku Enn 18/9

References

External links
 www.sdvijaymilton.com - Official website

Living people
Malayalam film cinematographers
Tamil film directors
Tamil film cinematographers
1971 births
Kannada film cinematographers